María Elena Galiano (1928 – October 30, 2000) was an Argentine arachnologist. She was one of the leading taxonomists of Neotropical jumping spiders. Galiano worked at the Bernardino Rivadavia Natural Sciences Museum in Buenos Aires. She died in an accident on October 30, 2000. The genera Galianora and Galianoella are named in her honor.

Taxa described
Galiano described numerous species and genera of spiders. She is the authority for the following genera:
 Admesturius Galiano, 1988
 Hisukattus Galiano, 1987
 Kalcerrytus Galiano, 2000
 Nycerella Galiano, 1982
 Simonurius Galiano, 1988
 Sumampattus Galiano, 1983
 Trydarssus Galiano, 1995
 Wedoquella Galiano, 1984
 Yepoella Galiano, 1970

References

20th-century Argentine zoologists
Arachnologists
1928 births
2000 deaths
Argentine women scientists
Women zoologists
20th-century women scientists